The 1998 season of the Torneo Descentralizado was the 83rd season of the top category of Peruvian football (soccer). It was played by 12 teams. The national champion was Universitario.

The national championship was divided into two half-year tournaments, the Torneo Apertura and the Torneo Clausura. Each was played on a home-and-away round-robin basis. The winners of each would play for the national title in a playoff. If the same club had won both tournaments, it would have won the national championship automatically.

Following-season Copa Libertadores berths went to the winner of each tournament, while the runners-up played for a Copa CONMEBOL spot. The bottom team on the aggregate table was relegated, while the eleventh place held a relegation/promotion playoff against the winner of the Segunda División (Second Division).

Teams

Torneo Apertura

Torneo Clausura

Clausura title play-off 

Sporting Cristal Clausura 1998 winnersTo Copa Libertadores 1999(Alianza Lima to Copa CONMEBOL playoff)

Copa CONMEBOL play-off

Season finals

Title

Aggregate table

Promotion play-off

Top scorers 
25 goals
 Nelson Esidio (Sporting Cristal)
19 goals
 Martín Reyes (Juan Aurich)
17 goals
 Roberto Farfán (Universitario)
 Sergio Ibarra (Sport Boys)
16 goals
 Andrés Gonzales (Deportivo Pesquero)
 Jorge Soto (Sporting Cristal)

External links 
 Peru 1998 season Details on RSSSF

Peruvian Primera División seasons
Peru
Primera Division Peruana